The George Gross Memorial Trophy is awarded to the most valuable player of the Canadian Championship. It is named after George Gross, a highly respected sports journalist who covered soccer for the Toronto Telegram and Toronto Sun.

The inaugural recipient of the Trophy was Matt Jordan of the Montreal Impact, who was named MVP of the 2008 Canadian Soccer Championship after posting two clean sheets and only allowing two goals in four games, en route to Montreal's tournament victory.

Dwayne De Rosario became the first Canadian winner of the Trophy in 2009 after scoring three goals in a 6–1 Toronto FC victory over Montreal in the final game of that year's tournament. De Rosario became the first repeat winner in 2010.

Joao Plata, an Ecuadorian Forward/Winger succeeded his former short-lived teammate and captain the following year after scoring the series-tying goal and then assisting on the championship winner in the second leg of the final, becoming the first South American trophy winner in 2011.

Toronto FC's Ryan Johnson claimed the 2012 title scoring two of the club's four goals over the four matches.

Montreal Impact's Justin Mapp was awarded the trophy in 2013 becoming the first non Toronto FC player since 2008, and the first winner of the MLS-version of Montreal. Mapp became the second repeat winner during the 2014 tournament.

Russell Teibert became the first Vancouver Whitecaps player to win the award in 2015.

Winners

References

Canadian Soccer Championship
Canadian soccer trophies and awards
Can
2008 establishments in Canada
Awards established in 2008
Annual events in Canada